Kashani, often shortened to Kashi or al-Kashi, is a surname meaning a person who comes from Kashan, Iran. It is also used as a feminine given name. Notable persons with that name include:

People

Surname
Abbas Hosseini Kashani (1931-2010), Iranian Grand Ayatollah
Abol-Ghasem Kashani (1882–1962), Iranian Ayatollah and politician
Afdal al-Din Kashani (died  1214), Persian poet and philosopher
Ali Hojjat Kashani (1921–1979), Iranian military officer and politician
Dariush Kashani, American-Iranian actor
Eliezer Kashani (1923–1947), an Irgun member in Mandatory Palestine 
Firoozeh Kashani-Sabet, American-Iranian historian
Habib Kashani, Iranian businessman and football administrator
Jafar Kashani (1944–2019), Iranian footballer
Jamshīd al-Kāshī ( 1380–1429), Persian astronomer and mathematician
Khalil Mobasher Kashani (born 1951), Iranian Grand Ayatollah
Mahmoud Kashani (born 1942), Iranian politician and academic
Mehran Kashani (born 1969), Iranian engineer and screenwriter
Mohammed Emami-Kashani (born 1931), Iranian Ayatollah and politician
Mohsen Fayz Kashani (1598–1680), Iranian poet, philosopher and muhaddith
Muhtasham Kashani (1500–1588), Persian poet
Sarmad Kashani (c. 1590–1661), Persian mystic, poet and saint in India of Jewish or Armenian origin
Shahrum Kashani (1971–2021), Italian-Iranian pop singer

Given name
Kashani Ríos (born 1991), Panamanian athlete

Persian-language surnames
Feminine given names